Fabian Guedes (born 16 August 1980), commonly known as Bolívar, is a Brazilian football manager and former player who played as a central defender. He is the current assistant manager of Chapecoense.

Born in Santa Cruz do Sul, Bolívar initially was a right back and then switched to center back. Very instrumental in the center of defense for Internacional in the 2006 Copa Libertadores which led to a transfer to AS Monaco for R$8,664,705, with 20% transfer fee belongs to third parties.

Honours
Grêmio
 Campeonato Gaúcho: 2001
 Copa do Brasil: 2001

Internacional
 Campeonato Gaúcho: 2003, 2004, 2005, 2009, 2011, 2012
 Copa Libertadores: 2006, 2010
 FIFA Club World Cup: 2006
 Copa Sudamericana: 2008
 Suruga Bank Championship: 2009
 Recopa Sudamericana: 2011

Botafogo
 Campeonato Carioca: 2013

References

External links
 
 

1980 births
Living people
People from Santa Cruz do Sul
Brazilian footballers
Brazilian football managers
Association football defenders
Brazilian expatriate footballers
Brazilian expatriate sportspeople in France
Expatriate footballers in France
Expatriate footballers in Monaco
Campeonato Brasileiro Série A players
Campeonato Brasileiro Série C players
Ligue 1 players
Esporte Clube Guarani players
Grêmio Foot-Ball Porto Alegrense players
Joinville Esporte Clube players
Sport Club Internacional players
AS Monaco FC players
Botafogo de Futebol e Regatas players
Esporte Clube Novo Hamburgo players
Associação Portuguesa de Desportos players
Copa Libertadores-winning players
Campeonato Brasileiro Série B managers
Campeonato Brasileiro Série D managers
União Esporte Clube managers
Esporte Clube Novo Hamburgo managers
Cianorte Futebol Clube managers
Grêmio Esportivo Brasil managers
Vila Nova Futebol Clube managers
Santa Cruz Futebol Clube managers
Associação Chapecoense de Futebol managers
Sportspeople from Rio Grande do Sul